Luis Miró Doñate (3 March 1913 – 15 September 1991) was a Spanish football player and coach. As a player Miró played for FC Barcelona.

He then coached several teams in Spain, such as Sabadell, Valencia CF, Sevilla FC and former club FC Barcelona. He had then short spells abroad with Olympique de Marseille and A.S. Roma, before coming back in Spain with CD Málaga.

References

External links 
La Liga player stats 
La Liga manager stats 
Profile

1913 births
1991 deaths
Spanish footballers
FC Barcelona players
La Liga players
Spanish football managers
La Liga managers
CE Sabadell FC managers
Real Valladolid managers
Valencia CF managers
RC Celta de Vigo managers
Sevilla FC managers
FC Barcelona managers
Olympique de Marseille managers
A.S. Roma managers
CD Málaga managers
Association football goalkeepers
Expatriate football managers in Italy
Expatriate football managers in France
Spanish expatriate sportspeople in France
Spanish expatriate sportspeople in Italy
Serie A managers
Ligue 1 managers